De gustibus non est disputandum, or de gustibus non disputandum est, is a Latin maxim meaning "In matters of taste, there can be no disputes" (literally "about taste, it should not be disputed"). The phrase is commonly rendered in English as "There is no accounting for taste(s)." The implication is that everyone's personal preference is a merely subjective opinion that cannot be right or wrong, so they should never be argued about as if they were. Sometimes the phrase is expanded as De gustibus et coloribus... referring to tastes and colors. The saying is an ancient Roman adage. Its vernacular and textual origin are unknown, and a subject of debate in itself.  

The phrase is misquoted in Act I of Anton Chekhov's play The Seagull. The character Shamrayev conflates it with the phrase de mortuis nil nisi bonum (in the alternative form: de mortuis, aut bene aut nihil: "of the dead, either [speak] good or [say] nothing"), resulting in "de gustibus aut bene, aut nihil", "Let nothing be said of taste but what is good."

See also 
 List of Latin phrases

References

External links 
 

Latin words and phrases

sv:Lista över latinska ordspråk och talesätt#D